Tanella Suzanne Boni (born 1954) is an Ivorian poet and novelist. Also an academic, she is Professor of Philosophy at the University of Abidjan. Apart from her teaching and research activities, she was the President of the association of writers of the Côte d'Ivoire from 1991 to 1997, and later the organizer of the International Poetry Festival in Abidjan from 1998 to 2002.

Biography
Tanella Boni was born in Abidjan, Côte d'Ivoire, where she was educated to high-school level, before going on to further university studies in Toulouse, France, and at the University of Paris, obtaining a PhD. She subsequently became Professor of Philosophy at the University of Cocody-Abidjan (now the University of Félix Houphouët-Boigny), as well as writing poetry, novels, short stories, criticism, and children's literature.

She served as President of the Writers' Association of Côte d'Ivoire from 1991 to 1997 and organized Abidjan's International Poetry Festival from 1998 to 2002. During the political strife in Côte d'Ivoire (from 2002 until 2011) she self-exiled to France. In 2005, she received the Ahmadou Kourouma Prize for her novel Matins de couvre-feu (Mornings after curfew). In 2009, she won the Antonio Viccaro International Poetry Prize. Since 2013, Boni divides her time between Abidjan and Paris.

She is a contributor to the 2019 anthology New Daughters of Africa, edited by Margaret Busby.

Bibliography
 Labyrinthe (poems), Editions Akpagnon, Lomé 1984
 Une vie de crabe (novel), Dakar: Nouvelles Editions Africaines du Sénégal, 1990
 De l'autre côté du soleil (children's story), Paris: NEA-EDICEF, 1991
 La fugue d'Ozone (children's story), Paris: NEA-EDICEF, 1992
 Grains de sable (poems), Limoges: Le bruit des autres, 1993
 Les baigneurs du Lac rose (novel), Abidjan: Nouvelles Editions Ivoiriennes, 1995; Paris: Editions du Serpent à Plumes, 2002
 Il n'y a pas de parole heureuse (poems), Limoges: Le bruit des autres, 1997
 L'atelier des génies (children's story), Paris: Acoria, 2001
 Chaque jour l'espérance (poems), Paris: L'Harmattan, 2002
 Ma peau est fenêtre d'avenir (poems), La Rochelle: Rumeur des Ages, 2004
 Gorée île baobab (poems), Limoges & Ecrits des forges, Trois-Rivières (Québec), 2004
 Matins de couvre-feu (novel), Paris: Editions du Serpent à plumes, 2005
 Que vivent les femmes d'Afrique (essay), Paris: Editions Panama, 2008, 
 Les nègres n’iront jamais au paradis (novel), Paris: Editions du Serpent à Plumes, 2006
 Le Rêve du dromadaire (poems, illustrated by Muriel Diallo), Cotonou: Ruisseaux d’Afrique, 2009
 Myriam Makeba : une voix pour la liberté (biography), Paris: Éditions À dos d'âne, 2009
 Jusqu’au souvenir de ton visage (poems), Paris: Alfabarre, 2010
 L’avenir a rendez-vous avec l’aube (poems), Vents d’ailleurs, Festival de La Roque-d'Anthéron, 2011, . Translated into English by Todd Fredson as The Future Has an Appointment with the Dawn, with an Introduction by Honorée Fanonne Jeffers, University of Nebraska Press, 2018,  
 Toute d’étincelles vêtue (poems), La Roque-d’Anthéron: Vents d’ailleurs, 2014
 Là où il fait si clair en moi (poems), Paris: Éditions Bruno Doucey, 2017

Awards
 2005: Ahmadou Kourouma Prize for Matins de couvre-feu
 2009: Antonio Vicarro International Poetry Prize

References

External links 
 Tanella Boni official website
 Bio-bibliography at "Lire les femmes et les littératures africaines" (in French)
 Review of the novel Matins de couvre-feu (in English)
 Two poems by Boni in English (translated by Patrick Williamson). Poetry in Translation.
 "Nine Poems by Tanella Boni", translated by Todd Fredson, Europe Now, Council for European Studies.

1954 births
20th-century poets
20th-century short story writers
20th-century women writers
Ivorian poets
Ivorian short story writers
Ivorian women novelists
Ivorian women poets
Ivorian women short story writers
Ivorian women writers
Living people
People from Abidjan
Academic staff of Université Félix Houphouët-Boigny
Ivorian novelists